Choisya ternata is a species of flowering plant in the family Rutaceae, known as Mexican orange blossom or Mexican orange.

Description
Its leaves have three leaflets (hence ternata) and are aromatic, releasing a smell reminiscent of basil when crushed. The white flowers are scented, appearing in spring (sometimes with limited repeat flowering in autumn).

Distribution and habitat
Choisya ternata originates from Mexico. It is drought tolerant, preferring well drained soils.

Cultivation

Choisya ternata is widely grown as an ornamental shrub in suitable climates. It responds well to pruning and shaping.

In addition to the species, a number of cultivars are grown, including the golden-leaved C. ternata 'Lich' (usually sold under the name ), and the inter-specific hybrid C. 'Aztec Pearl' (C. dumosa var. arizonica × C. ternata). The species and these two cultivars have gained the Royal Horticultural Society's Award of Garden Merit.

Phytochemistry
Many quinoline alkaloids have been isolated from leaves of C. ternata. C. ternata contains an alkaloid (ternanthranin), a volatile simple anthranilate, that was shown to have pain-killing effects in mice.

References

Zanthoxyloideae